Nauru competed at the 2016 Summer Olympics in Rio de Janeiro, Brazil, from 5 to 21 August 2016. The country's participation in Brazil was its sixth consecutive appearance at the Summer Olympics since its debut at the 1996 Summer Olympics. Nauru's delegation included two participants: Ovini Uera, a judoka in the men's middleweight judo category; and Elson Brechtefeld in the men's 56 kg weightlifting competition. Uera qualified as Nauru's top-ranked judoka, in the IJF World Ranking List through a quota slot from the Oceania Judo Union. Brechtefeld qualified by grant from the International Weightlifting Federation of an unused quota place. Uera was eliminated by Varlam Liparteliani in the round of 16 and Brechtefeld finished 15th in his event.

Background 
Nauru participated in six Summer Olympic Games between its debut in the 1996 Summer Olympics in Atlanta, United States and the 2016 Summer Olympics in Rio de Janeiro, Brazil. The country sent its largest delegation to a Summer Games when three athletes took part in both the 1996 and 2004 Olympics. Nauru has yet to win its first Olympic medal.

The Nauru National Olympic Committee selected two athletes, having chosen for the second successive time to compete only in judo and weightlifting. This was Nauru's second-largest team sent to the Olympics, tying with 2000 in Sydney and 2012 in London for this number of athletes. The Nauruan athletes chosen were judoka Ovini Uera in the men's 90 kg category, and weightlifter and 2010 Youth Olympian Elson Brechtefeld (men's 56 kg). Brechtefeld was the flag bearer for the opening ceremony and Uera for the closing ceremony.

Judo

Nauru qualified one judoka for the men's middleweight category (90 kg) at the Games. Ovini Uera earned the continental quota spot from the Oceania region, as Nauru's top-ranked judoka in the IJF World Ranking List of 30 May 2016. Uera said in an interview that he started judo in 2012 from his need to learn grapples in boxing. He said he "immediately fell in love with the sport".

Uera produced the nation's best result with an opening-round triumph over Belize's Renick James, before falling short in his next match to eventual silver medal winner Varlam Liparteliani of Georgia.

Weightlifting

Nauru received an unused quota place from the IWF to send a male weightlifter to the Olympics, the nation's sixth consecutive participation. Nauru has been relatively notable for its weightlifting, as one of its participants Marcus Stephen served as president of the country after his retirement from the sport. The country has previously won a medal at every edition of the Commonwealth Games it has contested.

References

External links 
 
 

Olympics
Nations at the 2016 Summer Olympics
2016